In the 1993–94 football season, Valencia CF failed to qualify for European competition as it ended 7th in La Liga and wasn't able to reach the quarterfinals in neither the Copa del Rey nor the UEFA Cup. The campaign was marked by the latter's 7–0 exit in Karlsruhe, the worst loss suffered by a Spanish team in European competition, and included the resignation of chairman Arturo Tuzón and the sacking of manager Guus Hiddink. However, Hiddink was eventually reinstated before the season was over after his own successor, Héctor Núñez, was also fired.

Squad

Transfers

Competitions

La Liga

League table

Table progression

Results

Copa del Rey

UEFA Cup

Statistics

Players statistics

Chronology

July
 Thursday, 1 — Hiddink denies knowing about Barcelona's alleged interest in Fernando but say they would listen an interesting offer.

References

Valencia CF seasons
Valencia